Good Spirit Lake is a lake on the eastern side of the Canadian province of Saskatchewan. It is a shallow lake notable for its naturally sandy beaches, parks, and sand dunes. One of Saskatchewan's six founding provincial parks, Good Spirit Lake Provincial Park, surrounds the western and southern shores of the lake. The lake is in the RM of Good Lake No. 274 and Yorkton,  to the south, is the nearest city. The hamlets of Burgis Beach and Canora Beach–the only two communities on the lake–are located on the eastern shore. The southern shore of the lake is accessed from Highway 229 and the northern shore is accessed from Highway 651. Highway 47 runs north to south west of the lake and Good Spirit Lake Provincial Park.

Good Spirit Lake's main inflow, Spirit Creek, flows into the lake at the northern end. At the southern end of the lake is a dam that was built to regulate water levels. The lake's outflow is from a channel that leads away from the dam and into a tributary of the Whitesand River.

History  
In the winter of 1774–75, Matthew Cocking of the Hudson's Bay Company stayed at the lake and called it "Witch Lake". In the late 1800s, the local postmaster Robert Russell Smith named it Devil's Lake as the naming was a misinterpretation of the Cree / Salteaux word "manitow", which actually means "good spirit". The European settlers of the time could not believe a spirit could be "good" so the term "Devil" was used. The local post office continued to use the name Devil's Lake until it closed in 1954.

Near the end of the last ice age, a river ran through the area now occupied by the lake. The river had deposited the sands that make up the lake's sandy shores and bottom and the dunes at the southern end of the lake. The dunes, which reach a height of up to five storeys, are within Good Spirit Provincial Park and there are interpretive hiking trails that traverse them.

Parks and recreation 
Good Spirit Lake Provincial Park is located along the lake's entire western and southern shores and it has three campgrounds with over 200 sites, a beach, picnic area, boat launch, and hiking trails. A section of the Trans Canada Trail winds its way around the park and the Dune Discovery Interpretive Trail goes through sand dunes. In the winter season, many of the trails are groomed for cross-country skiing and snowmobiling.

Other parks, campgrounds, resorts on Good Spirit Lake include:
 Mistik Resort Cabin Rentals
Good Spirit Bible Camp
Donald Gunn Subdivision
Sandy Beach
Parkland Resort
Canora Beach Resort
Bella Sands Resort
Good Spirit Petting Zoo

Fish species 
Fish commonly found in the lake include northern pike, perch, and walleye.

See also 
List of lakes of Saskatchewan
List of protected areas of Saskatchewan
Tourism in Saskatchewan
Good Spirit Acres

References 

Lakes of Saskatchewan
Good Lake No. 274, Saskatchewan
Dunes of Canada